Rear-Admiral Joseph Pierre Gilles Couturier  is a Royal Canadian Navy officer.

He joined the navy in 1983. Following this assignment, he was posted to Ottawa as an executive assistant to the Chief of the Defence Staff. After the tour in Ottawa, he was appointed commander of Maritime Operations Group Four.

He assumed command of Maritime Forces Pacific/Joint Task Force Pacific on 14 July 2015. In January 2016 it was announced that he would be appointed Deputy Commander of the Navy.

He was invested as an officer of the Order of Military Merit in 2012 and promoted to commander of the order in 2017.

In 2018, he joined Levio Consulting, a Canadian IT and Business consulting firm as its Chief Operating Officer (COO). 

In 2020 he joined Federal Fleet Services as Chief Executive Officer (CEO).

Awards and decorations
Couturier's personal awards and decorations include the following:

110px

120px

 CDS Commendation 
 Command Commendation

References

Year of birth missing (living people)
Living people
Commanders of the Order of Military Merit (Canada)
Canadian admirals
Royal Canadian Navy officers
Military personnel from Ottawa